Tiny Bubbles is an album by Hawaiian singer Don Ho. Released in 1966, the album peaked at #15 on the Billboard 200 chart due to the success of the single, the title track.

Track listing
Tiny Bubbles includes the following tracks.

Charts

References

1966 albums
Reprise Records albums
Traditional pop albums